Sai Ying Pun Community Complex is located at 2 High Street, Sai Ying Pun, Hong Kong. It is a 9-storey building built on the site of the Old Mental Hospital, of which only the granite facade and arched verandah were preserved.

History
The Old Mental Hospital was built in 1892. It was designed by Danby & Leigh (now Leigh & Orange). It was used as a quarters for the European nursing staff of the Civil Hospital (1846-1937) until the World War II. Originally, it contains only 10 bedrooms for the nurses, a matron's office, a chemical laboratory, 12 servants' quarters and other living, dining, kitchen, office and storage facilities. 
In the 1940s, the east wing was extended and six more arches were added to the original north facade, containing 18 arches with a pediment marking the middle and turrets at the ends to form a classically proportioned structure, during an extension uphill. The building was used to accommodate staff in 1941.

Mental Hospital
It was turned into a mental hospital after the war. In 1947, this mental hospital was the only one of its type in the city when the population in Hong Kong was one and a half million. 

The building was a female block of the mental hospital in the 1940s.

It continued to function as such until the Castle Peak Mental Hospital opened in 1961, and switched back as a day treatment centre for psychiatric out-patients until 1971.

High Street Ghost House
Tales of ghostly sightings were spread since it was abandoned in the 1970s. Therefore, it is popularly known as "High Street Ghost House" or Haunted House in High Street. 
This building became the haunt of curious teenagers and drug addicts who used the methadone clinic nearby before the reconstruction, because the building remained unoccupied for 20 years from 1970s.

It fell into disrepair and was badly ruined by two fires, which were believed to be inadvertently started by trespassers.
The Hong Kong Government decided in 1990s to keep the façade and rebuild a community centre within. In 2001, work was finally completed.

Therefore, only the north façade of the historic building is restored and preserved during the construction of Sai Ying Pun Community Complex as the historic building is the only specimen of its kind in Hong Kong.

The remains of the historic building is a Grade I Historic Building. It is part of the Central and Western Heritage Trail.

Facilities
There is a community hall in the Sai Ying Pun Community Complex.
It now houses several charity organizations, which provide services to the local community.

Gallery

See also
 Facadism
 King George V Memorial Park, Hong Kong

References

External links

Sai Ying Pun Community Complex: Rehabilitation 
Old Mental Hospital (Sai Ying Pun Community Complex Community Hall)

Grade I historic buildings in Hong Kong
Sai Ying Pun